Ribonuclease II may refer to one of two enzymes:
Ribonuclease T2
Exoribonuclease II